László Czéh (born 1 February 1968) is a Hungarian retired football player. He is currently the coach of Kecskemét TE.

Career
In the 1998/99 season, Czeh scored 19 goals for Maccabi Netanya to clinch the title of Israel best goalscorer in the second league.

Honours
 Hungarian Premier League: 1994–95
 Hungarian Cup: 1990, 1995
 Israeli Second Division: 1998–99

Notes

References

 1998/99 Israel B league
 1995/96 Israel League
 1997/98 Israel Cup
Nemzetisport

External links
 
 Profile at One
 Interview at BeitarJerusalem.org.il

1968 births
Living people
Hungarian footballers
Hungary international footballers
Pécsi MFC players
Fehérvár FC players
Ferencvárosi TC footballers
Hungarian expatriate footballers
Expatriate footballers in Israel
Beitar Jerusalem F.C. players
Hungarian expatriate sportspeople in Israel
Maccabi Ironi Ashdod F.C. players
Maccabi Netanya F.C. players
Hapoel Jerusalem F.C. players
Hapoel Beit She'an F.C. players
Liga Leumit players
Israeli Premier League players
Association football midfielders